Matt Gray (11 July 1936 – 13 September 2016) was a Scottish footballer who played for Third Lanark and Manchester City. After leaving City in 1967, Gray emigrated to South Africa, where he continued his football career. Gray died on 13 September 2016, aged 80.

References 

1936 births
2016 deaths
People from Renfrew
Association football inside forwards
Scottish footballers
Maryhill F.C. players
Stirling Albion F.C. players
Third Lanark A.C. players
Manchester City F.C. players
Scottish Football League players
English Football League players
Scottish expatriate footballers
Expatriate soccer players in South Africa
Highlands Park F.C. players
Scottish expatriate sportspeople in South Africa
Footballers from Renfrewshire
Scottish Junior Football Association players
Scottish Football League representative players
Port Elizabeth City F.C. players